The Courier of Lyon (French: L'affaire du courrier de Lyon) is a 1937 French historical drama film directed by Claude Autant-Lara and Maurice Lehmann and starring Pierre Blanchar, Dita Parlo and Jacques Copeau. It is based on the Courrier de Lyon case of 1796. A previous silent film inspired by the story, was released in 1923.

It was shot at the Epinay Studios in Paris. The film's sets were designed by the art director Jacques Krauss.

Cast
 Pierre Blanchar as Pierre-Joseph Lesurques  
 Dita Parlo as Mina Lesurques  
 Jacques Copeau as Le procureur-juge Daubenton  
 Charles Dullin as Le témoin aveugle  
 Sylvia Bataille as Madeleine Brebant  
 Hélène Robert as Eugénie Dargence  
 Monique Joyce as Claudine Faugier-Odot  
 Pierre Alcover as Valentin Durochat 
 Jean Tissier as Courriol  
 Jean-Pierre Kérien as Jean Bruer  
 André Noël as Franck Excofon  
 Jean Périer as Le bijoutier Eugène Legrand  
 Louis Florencie as Jean Delafolie  
 Marcel Duhamel as Guénot  
 Palmyre Levasseur as La femme Grossetête  
 Gilberte Géniat as La fille Sauton  
 Lily Laub as Madame Tallien  
 Jacqueline Jessus as Margot Lesurques  
 Jacques Varennes as Le président Gohier  
 Andrex as L'avocat de Lesurques  
 Philippe Rolla as L'accusateur public 
 Dorville as Pierre Choppart 
 Michel François as Pierre Lesurques 
 Bernard Lorrain as Le fils du notaire

References

Bibliography 
 Dayna Oscherwitz & MaryEllen Higgins. The A to Z of French Cinema. Scarecrow Press, 2009.

External links 
 

1937 films
1930s French-language films
Films directed by Claude Autant-Lara
Films directed by Maurice Lehmann
Films set in the 1790s
French historical drama films
1930s historical drama films
Films shot at Epinay Studios
French black-and-white films
1937 drama films
1930s French films